Bower is a town in South Australia, approximately halfway between Eudunda and Morgan on the Thiele Highway.

The area was originally the territory of the Ngadjuri people. The name Bower honours David Bower, a South Australian Member of Parliament (1865 – 1887) who donated land in the state for institutional purposes. By 1916, Bower had become a dispatch centre for mallee timber and roots. These were loaded at the railway station on the Morgan railway line and sent to Adelaide. Bower Public School operated in the town between 1917 and 1960, replacing an earlier Lutheran school forcibly closed during World War I.

The historic Lime Kiln Ruins on Bower Boundary Road are listed on the South Australian Heritage Register.

References

Towns in South Australia
Lime kilns in Australia